Mournful Unconcern (translit. Skorbnoye beschuvstviye) is the third produced film by Alexander Sokurov, completed in 1983, but the fourth released one, as it was banned by Soviet authorities until perestroika in 1987. The film, set during World War I, is inspired by Bernard Shaw's play Heartbreak House. Professional actors (Zamansky, Osipenko, Sokolova and others) were used alongside amateur actors, like in most early Sokurov films, and many of the trademarks of his cinematographic style were already apparent.

Plot
Family and friends gather in a decadent house to party. Despite their delusive distinction a raw passion for sex and violence comes to light.

Background
The film sparked controversy and was halted by the Soviet film authorities by cutting state subsidy for the film's budget during the production process, so it took time to find money and complete the film. It was nominated for the Golden Bear at the 37th Berlin International Film Festival in 1987.

Cast
 Ramaz Chkhikvadze as Captain Shotover
 Alla Osipenko as Ariadna
 Irina Sokolova as Nanny Guinness
 Tatyana Yegorova as Gessiona
 Vladimir Zamansky as Madzini
 Viktoria Amitova as Ellie (uncredited)
 Dmitri Bryantsev as Hector (uncredited)

References

External links
Sokurov's website

1987 drama films
1987 films
Soviet films based on plays
Films directed by Alexander Sokurov
Lenfilm films
1980s Russian-language films
Soviet drama films